Kayamkulam vaal (meaning Kayamkulam sword) is a double-edged sword that was used by the rulers and soldiers of Nair aristocracy (mostly in Travancore), in the Kayamkulam princely state of India. An example is on display at the Krishnapuram Palace Museum in Kayamkulam.

It is said to have been used by the Kayamkulam Rajas in the 18th century.
Some Nair families such as Evoor Kannampallil (Kayamkulam), Velathandethu house (Pallarimangalam), Padanilathu house (olakettyambalam), Edathitta house Changankulangara (The vaal presented to Valiyakulangara devi temple, Oachira), Thottathil Ellam Valiyakulangara, Oachira  menatheril  family Kayamkulam are keeping kayamkulam vaal as their historical evidence of family.

See also
 Khanda

References

External links
 Krishnapuram Palace and Archeological Museum, Kayamkulam

Blade weapons
Indian swords
Medieval weapons
Weapons of India